The Bundesstraße 9 (abbr. B9) is a German federal highway. It follows the left side of the Rhine from the Dutch border at Kranenburg upstream to the French border near the city of Lauterbourg, where it connects to the French A35 autoroute. The origins of the road can be traced back to Ancient Rome.

Some parts of the road have since been downgraded. The strip from Osterath to Neuss has been downgraded due to the Bundesautobahn 57 running in parallel. Between Cologne and Bonn the Bundesautobahn 555 replaced the Bundesstraße 9. From Bingen to Mainz the road has been replaced by the Bundesautobahn 60, and in the south the Bundesautobahn 65 replaced the Bundesstraße 9. However, some parts of the Bundesstraße 9 have been built to autobahn standards as well, most notably the part between Sinzig and Koblenz as well as the part between Frankenthal and Wörth am Rhein.

The part between Mainz and Worms is closed to transit truck traffic. Previously, this road had been commonly used by drivers who wanted to avoid the tolls on the autobahns. These drivers are now forced to take the Bundesautobahn 63 and Bundesautobahn 61.

References 

009
Upper Rhine
Middle Rhine